Devagandhari (pronounced devagāndhāri) is a raga (musical scale) in Indian classical music. In carnatic classical music, Devagandhari is a janya raga (derived scale), whose melakarta raga (parent scale, also known as janaka) is Shankarabharanam, 29th in the 72 Melakarta raga system. This is not to be confused with Karnataka Devagandhari, which is a janya of Kharaharapriya similar to Abheri.

It is also present in the Sikh tradition of northern India and is part of the Guru Granth Sahib.

In Carnatic music

Structure and lakshana 

Its  structure (ascending and descending scale) is as follows (see swaras in Carnatic music for details on below notation and terms):

  : 
  : 

Devagandhari ragam is an audava-vakra-sampurna raga meaning, in arohana 5 swaras come (so it is called audava) and in avarohana all swaras come (so sampurna), and there is a "zigzag" pattern of notes (so vakra). The notes used in this ragam are shadjam, chatushruti rishabham, antara gandharam, shuddha madhyamam, panchamam, chatushruti dhaivatam and kakili nishadam. This ragam sometimes includes the kaishika nishadam (anya swara – a note external to the scale, making this a bhashanga ragam).

The closest raga to this one is Arabhi. Some of the things that makes Arabhi different (though both share the same ascending and descending scale, in terms of basic notation) are:

 Devagandhari is sung with gamakas and vilambita kala prayogas (usages with elongated notes)
 Devagandhari is sung with deergha gandharam'' (elongated G3)

Popular compositions 
Here are some more compositions set to Devagandhari.

Film songs

Tamil

Title song

In Sikh tradition 

In the Sikh tradition from northern India it is part of the Guru Granth Sahib. Every raga has a strict set of rules which govern the number of notes that can be used; which notes can be used; and their interplay that has to be adhered to for the composition of a tune.
In the Guru Granth Sahib, the Sikh holy Granth (book), there are a total of 60 ragas compositions and this raga is the twenty-first raga to appear in the series. The composition in this raga appear on a total of 10 pages from page numbers 527 to 537.

Today Devagandhari is a rare, little-known, ancient raga.  Its performance time is the morning hours. Historically it has had three forms; the less ornamented type is described here.  In the Ragmala, Devagandhari is a ragini of Malkaunsa. Today it belongs to the Bilawal thata. Some relate this raga with Bliawal thata with asavari ang. Its mood is one of prayerful supplication presenting a heroic effect. The texts set to this raga reveal a heroic search for these qualities which lead one to the Lord. This raga was used primarily by Guru Arjan.  Forty-Seven hymns were composed to it including three by Guru Tegh Bahadar and six by Guru Ram Das.

 Jaati : Audava – sampurna
 Timing : second pehar
 Thaat :Bilawal / Bilawal - Asavari Ang 
 Aroh: Sa Re Ma Pa Dha Sa
 Avroh: Sa Ni Dha Pa, Ma Pa, Dha Ni Dha Pa, Ma Ga Re Sa
 Pakar: Dha Ni Dha Pa, Ma Ga, Sa Re Ma, Ga Sa Re Ga Sa
 Vadi: Ma
 Samvadi: Sa

See also 

 Kirtan
 Raga
 Taal

Notes

References

External links 
 GSA (The Gurmat Sangeet Academy)
 Gurmat Sangeet Project
 Raj Academy of Asian Music
 Sikhnet: Shabad for Printing

Janya ragas
Ragas in the Guru Granth Sahib